Sket Dance is a manga series written and illustrated by Kenta Shinohara and was serialized in Shueisha's shōnen magazine Weekly Shōnen Jump from July 2007 to July 2013. The chapters of Sket Dance were collected in a total of 32 tankōbon volumes, with the first one being released on November 2, 2007, and the final volume on August 2, 2013.

The series was conceived as two one-shots before it was officially serialized, with the first one-shot version debuting in January 2006 in Akamaru Jump, and the second version debuted as a 51-page one-shot seven months later in Weekly Shōnen Jump, this version more closely resembling the final serialized version.

Sket Dance follows the adventures of the Sket-dan, a high school club whose goal it is to help the students and teachers of Kaimei High School with their problems, as they do whatever it takes to help make their campus a better place. The story is mainly told in the perspective of the Sket-dan'''s three members: Bossun, the leader of the group; Himeko, the "muscle" and the only female in the group; and Switch, the otaku'' and the "brains" of the group.

Outside Japan, the series is licensed by Tong Li Publishing in Taiwan, by Kazé in France, by Elex Media Komputindo in Indonesia, and by Kim Đồng Publishing House in Vietnam.

Volume list

References

External links
 Official Shueisha Sket Dance introduction 

Sket Dance